Sanja Gavrilović (born 20 September 1982 in Split, Split-Dalmacija) is a female hammer thrower from Croatia. Her personal best throw is 70.07 metres, achieved in July 2008 in Ljubljana.

Competition record

References

1982 births
Living people
Croatian female hammer throwers
Athletes (track and field) at the 2004 Summer Olympics
Athletes (track and field) at the 2008 Summer Olympics
Olympic athletes of Croatia
Sportspeople from Split, Croatia
Athletes (track and field) at the 2005 Mediterranean Games
Mediterranean Games competitors for Croatia
20th-century Croatian women
21st-century Croatian women